Sir Benjamin Hammet (c. 173622 July 1800) was an English businessman, banker and politician, who served as Member of Parliament from Taunton (1782–1800), and as High Sheriff of London.

Contemporary accounts state that he was a footman, son of a Taunton barber, who courted and married Louisa Esdaile, the sister-in-law of his master John 'Vulture' Hopkins. Louisa was the daughter of Sir James Esdaile, a rich banker; and Hammet's success as a banker and building contractor was credited to the influence and funding provided by his father-in-law, who on the occasion of their marriage settled £5,000 on the bride.

Hammet was elected as Lord Mayor of London (a title which his father-in-law had held previously) in 1797, but paid a £1,000 penalty rather than serve (pleading ill health). He died 22 July 1800 at Castle Maelgwyn, his Welsh estate. Upon his death, his son John Hammet succeeded him as M.P., and would hold that seat until his own death in 1811.

References 

Members of the Parliament of Great Britain for Taunton
Sheriffs of the City of London
Aldermen of the City of London
British MPs 1784–1790
British MPs 1780–1784
British MPs 1790–1796
British MPs 1796–1800
English bankers
British construction businesspeople
1730s births
1800 deaths

Year of birth uncertain